St. Paul's Mar Thoma Church, chathenkary (chathenkary Pally) is a prominent parish church of the Mar Thoma Syrian Church.

Location
The church is located in Chathenkary, a small village in Pathanamthitta district of the Central Travancore region of Kerala, India.

Organisation
Yuvajana Sakhyam
Sunday school
Sevika Sangam
Edavaka mission
Are the organisation functions under the church

Churches in Pathanamthitta district
Mar Thoma Syrian churches